D. Srinivas may refer to

 D. Srinivas (instrumentalist), popularly known as Veena Srinivas
 D. Srinivas (politician), Congress party politician